The Addams Family are fictional characters who originated in a series of comics created by Charles Addams.

The Addams Family may also refer to:

Television
 The Addams Family (1964 TV series), a 1964–1966 live-action, television series sitcom, starring John Astin and Carolyn Jones
 The Addams Family (1973 TV series), a 1973 animated television series
 Halloween with the New Addams Family, a 1977 TV film, with most of the original cast from the 1964–1966 series
 The Addams Family (1992 TV series), a 1992 animated television series
 The New Addams Family, a 1998–1999 remake of the sitcom, starring Glenn Taranto and Ellie Harvie
 Wednesday (TV series), a 2022 Netflix series starring Jenna Ortega

Films
 The Addams Family (1991 film), a 1991 comedy film, starring Raúl Juliá and Anjelica Huston
 Addams Family Values, a 1993 comedy film, sequel to the 1991 film, also starring Raúl Juliá and Anjelica Huston
 Addams Family Reunion, a non-sequel, direct-to-video, 1998 comedy film, starring Tim Curry and Daryl Hannah
 The Addams Family (2019 film), a 2019 computer animated film, starring Oscar Isaac and Charlize Theron
 The Addams Family 2, a 2021 sequel to the 2019 film

Games
 The Addams Family (pinball), a 1992 pinball machine based on the 1991 film of the same name
 The Addams Family (video game), a 1992 platform game based on the 1991 film of the same name

Stage shows
 The Addams Family (musical), a 2010 musical comedy

See also
 
 Charles Addams (1912–1988), cartoonist
 Adams political family
 Adams family (disambiguation)